Bhoothathankettu is a dam and tourist spot in Ernakulam district in Kerala, India. It is situated outside the village of Pindimana, about 10 km away from the town of Kothamangalam and 50 km away from the main city of Kochi.
The original natural dam has been supplemented by a modern dam impounding the Bhoothathankettu Reservoir (Thattekad Reservoir).

Point of Interest

Large blocks of unshaped stones are placed on both sides of the Periyar River to form the dam, making it look like a natural dam built by superhumans. The name Bhoothathan Kettu, means "monster fort"; past generations believed it was built by a Bhootham (monster).

Also located here are:

 Bhoothathankettu reservoir
 Salim Ali Bird Sanctuary (Thattekad Bird Sanctuary)
 The Idamalayar reservoir is about 12 km distance from the place

Myth
The reason behind the dam's name is that monsters (Malayalam: Bhootham) planned to submerge the Trikkariyoor temple, whose presiding deity is Lord Shiva by making a dam in the Periyar river and flooding the area. Suspecting trickery the omnipotent Lord Shiva, came up with a plan to deter them. He faked the approaching dawn by a rooster's sound. The demons fearing the arrival of light fled the place. To this day there is a visible proof of their effort where you can see the boulders which the demons were supposed to have rolled onto the riverbed, the Old Bhothathankettu. The Periyar flows on through the narrow space which the demons did not quite manage to dam up.

Reality
It has been attributed to two great floods – one in the 4th century and the other in 1341, which threw open the port of Kochi. The massive landslides during the flood are believed to have caused gigantic rocks to roll down from the mountain and become entrenched in the Old Bhoothathankettu.

Incidents 
On 20 February 2007, 18 people, including three teachers, nine boys and six girls of a school excursion group from St Antony's UP School in Elavoor, Eranakulam district of Kerala drowned in Periyar river at Thattekkad. The tragedy occurred when water leaked into their boat, causing it to overturn. The boat which was the cause of the accident needed repair and was overloaded.

Pedal boats and speed boats are provided. The area around the boating facility is landscaped with tree houses and a children's play area. There is also a restaurant. The entrance fee is Rs-10/adult, for speed boat charge is Rs-500/ for 4 persons. There is a nature walk trail after the dam through thick growth to the old Boothathankettu which is very refreshing and the return path is parallel to the river. However, the water is very deep and strong undercurrents.
Edamalayar dam is 14  km drive through the thick jungle from Boothathankettu dam. You can find many picnic spots along the way. Apart from the fact that this land is deemed reserve forest, the area has a huge elephant and tiger population, so it is not advisable for people to picnic anywhere along this route. It is forbidden to use the stretch from Vadattupara to Idamalayar Dam without permission.

Transportation
The railway station at Aluva (a northern suburb of the city of Kochi) is about 43 km away.
Cochin International Airport is about 42 km and 26 km from Kochi city (Cochin).

Bhoothathankettu Mud Race 2018 
Bhoothathankettu Mud Race has conducted as part of the Onam an annual holiday and a National Festival of Kerala, every year. Entertainment programs and adventurous games are the main attractions of Bhoothathankettu Fest. Visitors from various parts of Kerala come to participate and enjoy the Bhoothathankettu Fest. Bhoothathankettu Mud Race (Bhoothathankettu Slush Fest) has been postponed to the October, due to floods in 2018.

Bhoothathankettu New Bridge 
The bridge built ( 296 m length and 11 m width) parallel to the Bhoothathankettu Dam was opened to the public for transportation. Irrigation Minister of Kerala K. Krishnankutty inaugurated the bridge on 10 June 2020.

References 

Dams in Kerala
Landslide-dammed lakes